Er. Tumke Bagra (born March 1, 1955 in Lipu Bagra, West Siang district) did his graduation in Civil Engineering and served as Technocrat and Bureaucrat in his various capacities under State government and presently is a leader of Bharatiya Janata Party from Arunachal Pradesh. He is a member of Arunachal Pradesh Legislative Assembly elected from Aalo West Constituency  in West Siang district. He became Deputy Speaker of the Arunachal Pradesh Legislative Assembly on 23 March 2016 but once again in March 2016, Bagra was elected as Deputy Speaker of the Arunachal Pradesh Legislative Assembly. On 23 May 2019, he was elected for the second term & presently holding  the Cabinet Ministry (Industry, Trade & Commerce and Skill Development) under Pema Kandu government.

References

People from West Siang district
1955 births
Living people
Arunachal Pradesh MLAs 2014–2019
Bharatiya Janata Party politicians from Arunachal Pradesh
Deputy Speakers of the Arunachal Pradesh Legislative Assembly
Arunachal Pradesh MLAs 2019–2024